"Many Men (Wish Death)" is a song by American rapper 50 Cent, from his debut studio album Get Rich or Die Tryin' (2003). The song samples "Out of the Picture" by Tavares and was produced by Darrell "Digga" Branch, Eminem and Luis Resto.

Music video
The video was directed by Jessy Tererro and produced by Jill Hardin and Darrell "Digga" Branch. The song's music video is about 50 Cent's shooting from May 24, 2000, when he was shot 9 times in Queens, New York, United States. Mekhi Phifer appears in the video as 50's hitman. Adam Rodriguez and Rory Cochrane, both stars of CSI: Miami at the time of production, appear as detectives. Gabriel Casseus appears as a person who is allied with the person that shoots 50 Cent. Tommy Lister appears as one of 50 Cent's associates. G-Unit members Lloyd Banks and Young Buck make cameo appearances.

Commercial performance
The song peaked at number 11 on the US Bubbling Under R&B/Hip-Hop Singles. On June 14, 2006, "Many Men (Wish Death)" was certified Gold by the Recording Industry Association of America (RIAA), for selling 500,000 copies in the United States of America.

Legacy
American rapper Pop Smoke interpolated the song on his 2020 track, "Got It on Me", and producer Metro Boomin sampled the song on his and 21 Savage's 2020 track, "Many Men".

Vietnamese American writer Ocean Vuong repeatedly references the song in his novel On Earth We're Briefly Gorgeous. As Vuong explained in an interview, "50 Cent’s song was ubiquitous in the early aughts, where so much of this book takes place. It also marked the last era of gangsta rap, whose cultural framework provided men and boys a means of performing masculinity while also reducing it to erroneous tropes of misogyny and violence." 

Lil Tjay released the track “FACESHOT” (Many Men Freestyle) on September 17, 2022, remixing the song.

Charts

Certifications

References

50 Cent songs
Song recordings produced by Eminem
Songs written by 50 Cent
Songs written by Luis Resto (musician)
2003 songs
2003 singles
Shady Records singles
Aftermath Entertainment singles
Interscope Records singles
Universal Music Group singles
Gangsta rap songs
Songs written by Keni St. Lewis